Jean-Baptiste Marie Pierre (6 March 1714 – 15 May 1789) was a French painter, draughtsman and administrator.

Life
He was a student of Charles-Joseph Natoire at the Académie royale de peinture et de sculpture and painted a self-portrait in 1732. From 1770 to 1789 he was Premier peintre du Roi.

Jean-Baptiste Marie Pierre's students included Étienne-Louis Boullée, Louis-Jacques Durameau, Nicolas-René Jollain, Friedrich Reclam, Étienne de La Vallée Poussin, Jean-Jacques-François Le Barbier, Antoine Vestier, Jean-Baptiste Tierce, and Hughes Taraval.

Gallery

Bibliography
 Nicolas Lesur & Olivier Aaron, Jean-Baptiste Marie Pierre 1714-1789 Premier peintre du roi, Paris, Arthena, 2009, 
Marc Furcy-Raynaud, Correspondance de M. d'Angiviller avec Pierre, J. Schemit, Paris, 2 volumes, 1905–07
Olivier Aaron, Jean-Baptiste Marie Pierre, 1714-1789, Cahiers du Dessin Français, issue 9, Galerie de Bayser, Paris; Ars Libri, Boston, 1993
Christian Michel, Charles-Nicolas Cochin et l'art des Lumières, École française de Rome, Rome, 1993 (Contains Pierre's letter on the causes of the decadence in the art of France)

External links
Jean-Baptiste Pierre on Artcyclopedia
 Jean-Baptiste Pierre on Base Joconde

1714 births
1789 deaths
18th-century French painters
French male painters
Prix de Rome for painting
French draughtsmen
Painters from Paris
Premiers peintres du Roi
18th-century French male artists